Chartway Federal Credit Union is a credit union headquartered in Virginia Beach and is chartered and regulated under the authority of the National Credit Union Administration (NCUA).  Chartway serves more than 190,000 members throughout Texas, Utah, and Virginia.

History
On September 4, 1959, seven civilian workers at the Norfolk Naval Air Station each invested $5.00 and incorporated NorVA N.A.S. Federal Credit Union. In October 1959, the organization that would later become Chartway Federal Credit Union was chartered. Its field of membership included civilian and military personnel, along with their family members. The charter also extended to employees of the credit union and their families. The main purpose of this new credit union was to provide low-cost loans and to provide a convenient place for its members to save in a more organized manner.

In January 1965, NorVA N.A.S. reached its first milestone of $1 million in assets and over 3,000 members. In 1969, the credit union had an opportunity to further expand with the passage of government legislation that allowed credit unions to change its charters. Under the new legislation, members became eligible for lifetime membership even if they left the qualifying field of membership. Because of this, the credit union was able to retain its members and open its membership to retired Navy department civilians.
In April 1972, the credit union changed its name to the Naval Air Norfolk Federal Credit Union. It also merged with Radron Credit Union to expand its field of membership to include the Cape Charles Air Force Station and anyone in the military who used either base.

In March 1983, the credit union changed its name again to Naval Air Federal Credit Union. In 1996, the credit union became Chartway Federal Credit Union. Because there were branches in many different states and a much broader field of membership, the name “Chartway” was chosen because it reflected the members loyalty and a dynamic new course.

In 2010, HeritageWest Credit Union and SouthWest Community Credit Union joined Chartway and Utah Central Credit Union became part of the organization in 2011.

Membership
Chartway serves members in branches in Texas, Utah, and Virginia. Prospective members may also join the credit union with a $10 donation to its charitable arm.

References

Berry, Carolyn. The Story of Chartway Federal Credit Union: From Cigar Boxes to Data Chips. Chesapeake, VA: Professional Printing Center, 2001.

Credit unions based in Virginia
Companies based in Virginia Beach, Virginia
Banks established in 1959